The 2020–21 Coupe de France preliminary rounds, Grand Est was the qualifying competition to decide which teams from the leagues of the Grand Est region of France took part in the main competition from the seventh round.

A total of 16 teams qualified from the Grand Est preliminary rounds. In 2019–20, SAS Épinal progressed the furthest in the main competition, reaching the quarter final, defeating Lille on the way, before eventually losing to Saint-Étienne.

Schedule
A total of 960 teams entered from the region. All teams from the Régional and District leagues, with the exception of the six Régional 1 teams that performed the best in last years competition, entered at the first round stage. Therefore, there were 467 ties in the first round on 30 August 2020. Five of the Régional 1 clubs exempted from the first round entered at the second round stage. The remaining exempted Régional 1 club was given a bye to the third round stage.

The third round draw, which saw the entry of the teams from Championnat National 3, took place on 15 September 2020. The fourth round draw, which saw the entry of the teams from Championnat National 2, took place in three parts over the 23 and 24 September 2020. The fifth round draw was made on 7 October 2020. The sixth round draw took place on 21 October 2020.

First round 
The first round is split into the separate competitions for the three sub-regions of Lorraine, Champagne-Ardenne and Alsace.

First round: Lorraine 
These matches were played on 29 and 30 August 2020, with one postponed until 9 September 2020.

First round: Champagne-Ardenne 
These matches were played on 30 August 2020.

First round: Alsace 
These matches were played on 29 and 30 August 2020, with four postponed until 6, 8 and 9 September 2020.

Second round 
The second round is split into the separate competitions for the three sub-regions of Lorraine, Champagne-Ardenne and Alsace.

Second round: Lorraine 
These matches were played on 12 and 13 September 2020, with one postponed until 16 September 2020.

Second round: Champagne-Ardenne 
These matches were played on 12 and 13 September 2020.

Second round: Alsace 
These matches were played on 12 and 13 September 2020, with one postponed to, and one replayed on, 20 September 2020.

Third round 
These matches were played on 19 and 20 September 2020, with two postponed to 27 and 30 September 2020.

Fourth round 
These matches were played on 3 and 4 October 2020, with two postponed to 11 October 2020.

Fifth round 
These matches were played on 17 and 18 October 2020.

Sixth round
These matches were played on 30 and 31 January 2021.

References

preliminary rounds